Chloe Coleman (born December 2008) is an American actress.

Career 
Coleman made her acting debut at the age of 5 in an episode of the Fox television series Glee in 2013. She was cast in January 2016 in the HBO limited series Big Little Lies, playing the daughter of the characters played by Zoe Kravitz and James Tupper. She would be nominated alongside the cast for the Screen Actors Guild Award for Outstanding Performance by an Ensemble in a Drama Series. In October 2018, Chloe was cast to star alongside Dave Bautista in My Spy. In 2019, she was cast in multiple films, including the thriller film Gunpowder Milkshake alongside Karen Gillan, in the romantic comedy Marry Me opposite Jennifer Lopez and Owen Wilson, and was listed as part of the cast for James Cameron's Avatar: The Way of Water. She began appearing in a recurring role in the television series Upload in 2020.

Her upcoming roles include opposite Adam Driver in 65, the fantasy adventure film Dungeons & Dragons: Honor Among Thieves, and Pain Hustlers alongside Emily Blunt and Chris Evans''.

Personal life
Coleman's father is a camera operator and her mother a television producer, and she is of Eastern European, English and African descent.

Filmography

Film

Television

References

External links
 

2008 births
Living people
21st-century American actresses
American film actresses
American television actresses
American child actresses
American voice actresses